The 2019 San Diego Padres season was the 51st season of the San Diego Padres franchise. The Padres played their home games at Petco Park as members of the Major League Baseball's National League West Division. On September 21, the Padres fired Andy Green as manager. Bench coach Rod Barajas was promoted to interim manager.

The Padres hit a franchise record seven home runs in their 19–4 win against the Toronto Blue Jays on May 25. Though they improved on their record from the previous season, they still failed to qualify for the postseason for the thirteenth straight year.

Season standings

National League West

National League Wildcard

Record vs. opponents

Game log

|-style=background:#bfb;"
||1|| March 28 || Giants || 2–0 || Lauer (1–0) || Bumgarner (0–1) || Yates (1) || 44,655 || 1–0 || W1
|-style=background:#bfb;"
||2|| March 29 || Giants || 4–1 || Lucchesi (1–0) || Holland (0–1) || Yates (2) || 33,769 || 2–0 || W2
|-style=background:#fbb;"
||3|| March 30 || Giants || 2–3 || Rodríguez (1–0) || Margevicius (0–1) || Smith (1) || 41,899 || 2–1 || L1
|-style=background:#bfb;"
||4|| March 31 || Giants || 3–1 || Warren (1–0) || Vincent (0–1) || Yates (3) || 38,444 || 3–1 || W1
|-

|-style=background:#fbb;"
||5|| April 1 || Diamondbacks || 3–10 || Kelly (1–0) || Strahm (0–1) || Duplantier (1) || 18,683 || 3–2 || L1
|-style=background:#fbb;"
||6|| April 2 || Diamondbacks || 5–8 || Greinke (1–1) || Lauer (1–1) || Holland (2) || 22,504 || 3–3 || L2
|-style=background:#bfb;"
||7|| April 3 || Diamondbacks || 4–1 || Lucchesi (2–0) || Ray (0–1) || — || 19,376 || 4–3 || W1
|-style=background:#bbb
||–|| April 4 || @ Cardinals ||Colspan=7|Postponed (rain): Makeup date April 5
|-style=background:#bfb;"
||8|| April 5|| @ Cardinals || 5–3 || Stock (1–0) || Reyes (0–1) || Yates (4) || 46,615 || 5–3 || W2
|-style=background:#bfb;"
||9|| April 6 || @ Cardinals || 6–4 || Wisler (1–0) || Miller (0–1) || Yates (5) || 44,492 || 6–3 || W3
|-style=background:#fbb;"
||10|| April 7|| @ Cardinals || 1–4 || Wainwright (1–0) || Strahm (0–2) || Hicks (1) || 44,340 || 6–4 || L1
|-style=background:#bfb;"
||11|| April 8 || @ Giants || 6–5 || Lauer (2–1) || Moronta (0–2) || Yates (6) || 28,625 || 7–4 || W1
|-style=background:#fbb;"
||12|| April 9 || @ Giants || 2–7 || Holland (1–1) || Lucchesi (2–1) || — || 28,506 || 7–5 || L1
|-style=background:#bfb;"
||13|| April 10 || @ Giants || 3–1 || Margevicius (1–1) || Rodríguez (1–2) || Yates (7) || 28,584 || 8–5 || W1
|-style=background:#bfb;"
||14|| April 11 || @ Diamondbacks || 7–6 || Stammen (1–0) || Bradley (0–1) || Wingenter (1) || 15,449 || 9–5 || W2
|-style=background:#bfb;"
||15|| April 12 || @ Diamondbacks || 2–1 || Reyes (1–0) || Weaver (0–1) || Yates (8) || 22,209 || 10–5 || W3
|-style=background:#bfb;"
||16|| April 13 || @ Diamondbacks || 5–4 || Stammen (2–0) || Andriese (2–1) || Yates (9) || 27,256 || 11–5 || W4
|-style=background:#fbb;"
||17|| April 14 || @ Diamondbacks || 4–8 || Greinke (2–1) || Lauer (2–2) || — || 25,489 || 11–6 || L1
|-style=background:#fbb;"
||18|| April 15 || Rockies || 2–5 || Senzatela (1–0) || Lucchesi (2–2) || Davis (1) || 24,867 || 11–7 || L2
|-style=background:#fbb;"
||19|| April 16 || Rockies || 2–8 || Gray (1–3) || Margevicius (1–2) ||  — || 24,963 || 11–8 || L3
|-style=background:#fbb;"
||20|| April 18 || Reds || 1–4 || Roark (1–0) || Paddack (0–1) || Iglesias (3) || 26,577 || 11–9 || L4
|-style=background:#fbb;"
||21|| April 19 || Reds || 2–3  || Hughes (2–0) || Stammen (2–1) || Lorenzen (1) || 33,442 || 11–10 || L5
|-style=background:#fbb;"
||22|| April 20 || Reds || 2–4 || Castillo (2–1) || Lauer (2–3) || Iglesias (4) || 37,137 || 11–11 || L6
|-style=background:#bfb;"
||23|| April 21 || Reds || 4–3 || Lucchesi (3–2) || Mahle (0–2) || Yates (10) || 25,932 || 12–11 || W1
|-style=background:#bfb;"
||24|| April 23 || Mariners || 6–3 || Margevicius (2–2) || Swanson (0–2) || Yates (11) || 25,154 || 13–11 || W2
|-style=background:#bfb;"
||25|| April 24 || Mariners || 1–0 || Paddack (1–1) || Hernández (1–2) || Yates (12) || 23,417 || 14–11 || W3
|-style=background:#bfb;"
||26|| April 26 || @ Nationals || 4–3 || Stammen (3–1) || Doolittle (3–1) || Yates (13) || 27,193 || 15–11 || W4
|-style=background:#bfb;"
||27|| April 27 || @ Nationals || 8–3  || Perdomo (1–0) || Suero (1–3) || — || 35,422 || 16–11 || W5
|-style=background:#fbb;"
||28|| April 28 || @ Nationals || 6–7  || Miller (1–0) || Wisler (1–1) || — || 30,186 || 16–12|| L1
|-style=background:#fbb;"
||29|| April 29 || @ Braves || 1–3 || Soroka (2–1) || Margevicius (2–3) || Webb (1) || 19,353 || 16–13 || L2
|-style=background:#bfb;"
||30|| April 30 || @ Braves || 4–3 || Paddack (2–1) || Teherán (2–4) || Yates (14) || 18,626 || 17–13 || W1
|-

|-style=background:#fbb;"
||31|| May 1 || @ Braves || 1–5 || Fried (4–1) || Quantrill (0–1) || — || 20,394 || 17–14 || L1
|-style=background:#bfb;"
||32|| May 2 || @ Braves || 11–2 || Strahm (1–2) || Foltynewicz (0–1) || — || 23,746 || 18–14 || W1
|-style=background:#fbb;"
||33|| May 3 || Dodgers || 3–4 || Alexander (2–1) || Yates (0–1) || Jansen (11) || 44,425 || 18–15 || L1
|-style=background:#fbb;"
||34|| May 4 || Dodgers || 6–7 || Stripling (2–2) || Yates (0–2) || Jansen (12) || 44,558 || 18–16 || L2
|-style=background:#bfb;"
||35|| May 5 || Dodgers || 8–5 || Warren (2–0) || Jansen (2–1) || — || 44,473 || 19–16 || W1
|-style=background:#bfb;" 
||36|| May 6 || Mets || 4–0 || Paddack (3–1) || deGrom (2–4) || Stammen (1) || 20,176 || 20–16 || W2
|-style=background:#fbb;"
||37|| May 7 || Mets || 6–7 || Lugo (2–0) || Warren (2–1) || Díaz (9) || 23,129 || 20–17 || L1
|-style=background:#bfb;" 
||38|| May 8 || Mets || 3–2 || Reyes (2–0) || Bashlor (0–1) || Yates (15) || 21,952 || 21–17 || W1
|-style=background:#fbb;"
||39|| May 10 || @ Rockies || 2–12 || Márquez (4–2) || Lauer (2–4) || — || 27,594 || 21–18 || L1
|-style=background:#bfb;"
||40|| May 11 || @ Rockies || 4–3 || Stammen (4–1) || Davis (1–1) || Yates (16) || 37,118 || 22–18 || W1
|-style=background:#fbb;"
||41|| May 12 || @ Rockies || 7–10 || Senzatela (3–2) || Margevicius (2–4) || — || 40,234 || 22–19 || L1
|-style=background:#fbb;"
||42|| May 14 || @ Dodgers || 3–6 || Kershaw (3–0) || Paddack (3–2) || Jansen (13) || 46,460 || 22–20 || L2
|-style=background:#fbb;"
||43|| May 15 || @ Dodgers || 0–2 || Maeda (5–2) || Strahm (1–3) || Jansen (14) || 41,671 || 22–21 || L3
|-style=background:#bfb;"
||44|| May 16 || Pirates || 4–3 || Warren (3–1) || Rodríguez (0–3) || Yates (17) || 20,877 || 23–21 || W1
|-style=background:#fbb;"
||45|| May 17 || Pirates || 3–5 || Lyles (4–1) || Lucchesi (3–3) || — || 28,913 || 23–22 || L1
|-style=background:#fbb
||46|| May 18 || Pirates || 2–7 || Brault (1–1) || Margevicius (2–5) || — || 39,856 || 23–23 || L2
|-style=background:#fbb
||47|| May 19 || Pirates || 4–6 || Musgrove (3–4) || Quantrill (0–2) || Vázquez (13) || 29,863 || 23–24 || L3
|-style=background:#bfb;"
||48|| May 20 || Diamondbacks || 2–1 || Paddack (4–2) || Weaver (3–3) || Yates (18) || 17,578 || 24–24 || W1
|-style=background:#bfb;"
||49|| May 21 || Diamondbacks || 3–2 || Strahm (2-3) || Greinke (6-2) || Yates (19) || 19,969 || 25–24 || W2
|-style=background:#bfb;"
||50|| May 22 || Diamondbacks || 5–2 || Lauer (3-4) || Kelly (4-5) || Yates (20) || 18,715 || 26–24 || W3
|-style=background:#bfb;"
||51|| May 24 || @ Blue Jays || 6–3 || Wisler (2-1) || Hudson (3-2) || Stammen (2) || 19,480 || 27–24 || W4
|-style=background:#bfb;"
||52|| May 25 || @ Blue Jays || 19–4 || Quantrill (1-2) || Jackson (0-2) || — || 24,212 || 28–24 || W5
|-style=background:#fbb;"
||53|| May 26 || @ Blue Jays || 1–10 || Stroman (3–6) || Erlin (0–1) || — || 24,462 || 28–25 || L1
|-style=background:#fbb;"
||54|| May 27 || @ Yankees || 2–5 || Hale (1–0) || Strahm (2–4) || Chapman (15) || 46,254 || 28–26 || L2
|-style=background:#bfb;"
||55|| May 28 || @ Yankees || 5–4 || Lauer (4–4) || Tanaka (3–4) || Yates (21) || 37,028 || 29–26 || W1
|-style=background:#fbb;"
||56|| May 29 || @ Yankees || 0–7 || Holder (4–2) || Paddack (4–3) || — || 40,918 || 29–27 || L1
|-style=background:#bfb;"
||57|| May 31 || Marlins || 5–2 || Lucchesi (4–3) || Smith (3–3) || Yates (22) || 25,019 || 30–27 || W1
|-

|-style=background:#fbb;"
||58|| June 1 || Marlins || 3–9 || Ureña (4–6) || Margevicius (2–6) || — || 26,858 || 30–28 || L1
|-style=background:#fbb;"
||59|| June 2 || Marlins || 3–9 || Richards (3–5) || Strahm (2–5) || — || 31,650 || 30–29 || L2
|-style=background:#bfb;"
||60|| June 3 || Phillies || 8–2 || Lauer (5–4) || Nola (6–1) || — || 21,654 || 31–29 || W1
|-style=background:#fbb;"
||61|| June 4 || Phillies || 6–9 || Eickhoff (3–3) || Paddack (4–4) || Neris (11) || 25,821 || 31–30 || L1
|-style=background:#fbb;"
||62|| June 5 || Phillies || 5–7 || Nicasio (1–2) || Stammen (4–2) || Neris (12) || 23,004 || 31–31 || L2
|-style=background:#bfb;"
||63|| June 6 || Nationals || 5–4 || Lucchesi (5–3) || Corbin (5–4) || Yates (23) || 19,908 || 32–31 || W1
|-style=background:#bfb;"
||64|| June 7 || Nationals || 5–4 || Warren (4–1) || Doolittle (4–2) || — || 21,645 || 33–31 || W2
|-style=background:#fbb;"
||65|| June 8 || Nationals || 1–4 || Scherzer (4–5) || Lauer (5–5) || Doolittle (14) || 30,219 || 33–32 || L1
|-style=background:#fbb;"
||66|| June 9 || Nationals || 2–5 || Strasburg (7–3) || Stammen (4–3) || — || 30,518 || 33–33 || L2
|-style=background:#fbb;"
||67|| June 11 || @ Giants || 5–6 || Melancon (3–1) || Wingenter (0–1) || Smith (15) || 28,535 || 33–34 || L3
|-style=background:#fbb;"
||68|| June 12 || @ Giants || 2–4 || Anderson (2–1) || Lucchesi (5–4) || Smith (16) || 31,188 || 33–35 || L4
|-style=background:#fbb;"
||69|| June 13 || @ Rockies || 6–9 || Gray (6–5) || Strahm (2–6) || — || 35,504 || 33– 36 || L5
|-style=background:#bfb;"
||70|| June 14 || @ Rockies || 16–12  || Stammen (5–3) || Díaz (1–1) || — || 38,077 || 34–36 || W1
|-style=background:#fbb;"
||71|| June 15 || @ Rockies || 8–14 || Márquez (7–3) || Lauer (5–6) || — || 46,133 || 34–37 || L1
|-style=background:#bfb;"
||72|| June 16 || @ Rockies || 14–13 || Reyes (3–0) || Davis (1–2) || Yates (24) || 47,526 || 35–37 || W1
|-style=background:#bfb;"
||73|| June 17 || Brewers || 2–0 || Lucchesi (6–4) || Chacín (3–8) || Yates (25) || 24,914 || 36–37 || W2
|-style=background:#bfb;"
||74|| June 18 || Brewers || 4–1 || Allen (1–0)|| Woodruff (8–2) || Yates (26) || 29,112 || 37–37 || W3
|-style=background:#bfb;"
||75|| June 19 || Brewers || 8–7 || Reyes (4–0) || Jeffress (1–1) || Stammen (3) || 28,144 || 38–37 || W4
|-style=background:#fbb;"
||76|| June 21 || @ Pirates || 1–2 || Musgrove (5–7) || Lauer (5–7) || Vázquez (18) || 33,437 || 38–38 || L1
|-style=background:#fbb;"
||77|| June 22 || @ Pirates || 3–6 || Crick (3–3) || Stammen (5–4) || Vázquez (19) || 26,919 || 38–39 || L2
|-style=background:#fbb;"
||78|| June 23 || @ Pirates || 10–11  || Liriano (2–1) || Wisler (2–2) || — || 25,294 || 38–40 || L3
|-style=background:#bfb;"
||79|| June 25 || @ Orioles || 8–3 || Allen (2–0) || Yacabonis (1–2) || — || 21,644 || 39–40 || W1
|-style=background:#bfb;"
||80|| June 26 || @ Orioles || 10–5 || Strahm (3–6) || Bundy (3–10) || Stammen (4) || 13,408 || 40–40 || W2
|-style=background:#bfb;"
||81|| June 28 || Cardinals || 3–1 || Quantrill (2–2) || Wacha (5–4) || Yates (27) || 33,329 || 41–40 || W3
|-style=background:#bfb;"
||82|| June 29 || Cardinals || 12–2 || Paddack (5–4) || Hudson (6–4) || — ||  44,407 || 42–40 || W4
|-style=background:#fbb;"
||83|| June 30 || Cardinals || 3–5  || Martínez (2–0) || Wieck (0–1) || Leone (1) || || 42–41 || L1
|-

|-style=background:#fbb;"
||84|| July 1 || Giants || 2–13 || Samardzija (5–7) || Allen (2–1) || — || 25,274 || 42–42 || L2
|-style=background:#fbb;"
||85|| July 2 || Giants || 4–10 || Beede (2–3) || Strahm (3–7) || — || 24,007 || 42–43 || L3
|-style=background:#fbb;"
||86|| July 3 || Giants || 5–7 || Gott (5–0) || Perdomo (1–1) || Smith (22) || 33,905 || 42–44 || L4
|-style=background:#fbb;"
||87|| July 4 || @ Dodgers || 1–5 || Ryu (10–2) || Lamet (0–1) || — || 53,801 || 42–45 || L5
|-style=background:#bfb;"
||88|| July 5 || @ Dodgers || 3–2 || Stammen (6–4) || García (1–3) || Yates (28) || 49,790 || 43–45 || W1
|-style=background:#bfb;"
||89|| July 6 || @ Dodgers || 3–1 || Wingenter (1–1) || Maeda (7–5) || Yates (29) || 53,610 || 44–45 || W2
|-style=background:#bfb;"
||90|| July 7 || @ Dodgers || 5–3 || Lucchesi (7–4) || Stripling (3–3) || Yates (30) || 44,171 || 45–45 || W3
|-style="text-align:center; background:#bbcaff;"
| colspan="10"|90th All-Star Game in Cleveland, OH
|-style="text-align:center; background:#bbcaff;"
| colspan=10 |Representing the Padres: Kirby Yates 
|-style=background:#fbb;"
||91|| July 12 || Braves || 3–5 || Keuchel (3–2) || Lamet (0–2) || Jackson (15) || 34,692 || 45–46 || L1
|-style=background:#fbb;"
||92|| July 13 || Braves || 5–7  || Newcomb (3–1) || Perdomo (1–2) || Jackson (16) || 43,148 || 45–47 || L2
|-style=background:#fbb;"
||93|| July 14 || Braves || 1–4 || Soroka (10–1) || Wingenter (1–2) || Minter (5) || 34,739 || 45–48 || L3
|-style=background:#fbb;"
||94|| July 16 || @ Marlins || 7–12 || Yamamoto (4–0) || Allen (2–2) || — || 8,151 || 45–49 || L4
|-style=background:#bfb;"
||95|| July 17 || @ Marlins || 3–2 ||  Paddack (6–4) || Richards (3–11) || Yates (31) || 7,818 || 46–49 || W1
|-style=background:#fbb;"
||96|| July 18 || @ Marlins || 3–4 || Romo (2–0) || Wingenter (1–3) || — || 21,149 || 46–50 || L1
|-style=background:#fbb;"
||97|| July 19 || @ Cubs || 5–6 || Strop (2–3) || Stammen (6–5) || Kimbrel (5) || 39,526 || 46–51 || L2
|-style=background:#fbb;"
||98|| July 20 || @ Cubs || 5–6 || Quintana (8–7) || Lucchesi (7–5) || Kimbrel (6) || 40,314 || 46–52 || L3
|-style=background:#bfb;"
||99|| July 21 || @ Cubs || 5–1 || Quantrill (3–2) || Hendricks (7–8) || — || 39,954 || 47–52 || W1
|-style=background:#fbb;"
||100|| July 23 || @ Mets || 2–5 || Vargas (5–5) || Paddack (6–5) || Díaz (22) || 33,199 || 47–53 || L1
|-style=background:#bfb;"
||101|| July 24 || @ Mets || 7–2 || Strahm (4–7) || Syndergaard (7–5) || — || 32,252 || 48–53 || W1
|-style=background:#fbb;"
||102|| July 25 || @ Mets || 0–4 || deGrom (6–7) || Lauer (5–8) || — || 37,822 || 48–54 || L1
|-style=background:#fbb;"
||103|| July 26 || Giants || 1–2  || Melancon (4–2) || Allen (2–3) || Smith (25) || 41,951 || 48–55 || L2
|-style=background:#bfb;"
||104|| July 27 || Giants || 5–1 || Quantrill (4–2) || Anderson (3–3) || — || 41,371 || 49–55 || W1
|-style=background:#fbb;"
||105|| July 28 || Giants || 6–7 || Bumgarner (6–7) || Perdomo (1–3) || Smith (26) || 35,087 || 49–56 || L1
|-style=background:#bfb;"
||106|| July 29 || Orioles || 8–1 || Paddack (7–5) || Hess (1–10) || — || 34,290 || 50–56 || W1
|-style=background:#fbb;"
||107|| July 30 || Orioles || 5–8 || Castro (1–1) || Strahm (4–8) || Armstrong (3) || 30,286 || 50–57 || L1
|-

|-style=background:#fbb
||108|| August 1 || @ Dodgers || 2–8 || Kershaw (10–2) || Lucchesi (7–6) || — || 53,181 || 50–58 || L2
|-style=background:#bfb
||109|| August 2 || @ Dodgers || 5–2 || Lauer (6–8) || May (0–1) || Yates (32) || 50,780 || 51–58 || W1
|-style=background:#fbb
||110|| August 3 || @ Dodgers || 1–4 || Buehler (10–2) || Quantrill (4–3) || — || 54,010 || 51–59 || L1
|-style=background:#fbb
||111|| August 4 || @ Dodgers || 10–11 || Báez (6–2) || Yates (0–3) || — || 44,110 || 51–60 || L2
|-style=background:#bfb
||112|| August 6 || @ Mariners || 9–4 || Lamet (1–2) || LeBlanc (6–5) || — || 24,020 || 52–60 || W1
|-style=background:#fbb
||113|| August 7 || @ Mariners || 2–3 || Magill (3–0) || Muñoz (0–1) || Bass (2) || 20,142 || 52–61 || L1
|-style=background:#bfb
||114|| August 8 || Rockies || 9–3 || Strahm (5–8) || Gray (10–8) || — || 27,806 || 53–61 || W1
|-style=background:#bfb
||115|| August 9 || Rockies || 7–1 || Quantrill (5–3) || Freeland (3–10) || — || 27,882 || 54–61 || W2
|-style=background:#bfb
||116|| August 10 || Rockies || 8–5 || Muñoz (1–1) || Díaz (4–3) || Yates (33) || 42,564 || 55–61 || W3
|-style=background:#fbb
||117|| August 11 || Rockies || 3–8 || Márquez (11–5) || Stammen (6–6) || — || 28,930 || 55–62 || L1
|-style=background:#fbb
||118|| August 12 || Rays || 4–10 || Pruitt (2–0) || Lucchesi (7–7) || — || 21,301 || 55–63 || L2
|-style=background:#fbb
||119|| August 13 || Rays || 5–7 || Anderson (4–4) || Báez (0–1) || Pagán (13) || 25,261 || 55–64 || L3
|-style=background:#bfb
||120|| August 14 || Rays || 7–2 || Quantrill (6–6) || Beeks (5–2) || — || 22,886 || 56–64 || W1
|-style=background:#fbb
||121|| August 16 || @ Phillies || 4–8 || Velasquez (5–7) || Paddack (7–6) || — || 26,084 || 56–65 || L1
|-style=background:#bfb
||122|| August 17 || @ Phillies || 5–3 || Lamet (2–2) || Pivetta (4–5) || Yates (34) || 31,332 || 57–65 || W1
|-style=background:#bfb
||123|| August 18 || @ Phillies || 3–2 || Lucchesi (8–7) || Hughes (2–5) || Yates (35) || 36,210 || 58–65 || W2
|-style=background:#bfb
||124|| August 19 || @ Reds || 3–2 || Perdomo (2–3) || Bauer (10–10) || Yates (36) || 10,176 || 59–65 || W3
|-style=background:#fbb
||125|| August 20 || @ Reds || 2–3 || Gray (9–6) || Quantrill (6–4) || Iglesias (25) || 12,468 || 59–66 || L1
|-style=background:#fbb
||126|| August 21 || @ Reds || 2–4 || Castillo (12–5) || Yardley (0–1) || Iglesias (26) || 13,397 || 59–67 || L2
|-style=background:#fbb
||127|| August 23 || Red Sox || 0–11 || Rodríguez (15–5) || Paddack (7–7) || — || 42,904 || 59–68 || L3
|-style=background:#fbb
||128|| August 24 || Red Sox || 4–5 || Barnes (4–4) || Yates (0–4) || Workman (8) || 42,625 || 59–69 || L4
|-style=background:#bfb
||129|| August 25 || Red Sox || 3–1 || Lucchesi (9–7) || Johnson (1–3) || Yates (37) || 38,026 || 60–69 || W1
|-style=background:#bfb
||130|| August 26 || Dodgers || 4–3 || Lauer (7–8) || May (1–3) || Yates (38) || 26,172 || 61–69 || W2
|-style=background:#fbb
||131|| August 27 || Dodgers || 0–9 || Buehler (11–3) || Quantrill (6–5) || — || 27,952 || 61–70 || L1
|-style=background:#fbb
||132|| August 28 || Dodgers || 4–6  || Jansen (4–3) || Yates (0–5) || Sadler (1) || 26,871 || 61–71 || L2
|-style=background:#bfb
||133|| August 29 || @ Giants || 5–3 || Paddack (8–7) || Rodríguez (5–7) || Muñoz (1) || 33,135 || 62–71 || W1
|-style=background:#fbb
||134|| August 30 || @ Giants || 3–8 || Bumgarner (9–8) || Lamet (2–3) || — || 34,293 || 62–72 || L1
|-style=background:#bfb
||135|| August 31 || @ Giants || 4–1 || Stammen (7–6) || Watson (2–2) || Yates (39) || 36,424 || 63–72 || W1
|-

|-style=background:#bfb
||136|| September 1 || @ Giants || 8–4 || Lauer (8–8) || Samardzija (9–11) || — || 38,701 || 64–72 || W2
|-style=background:#fbb
||137|| September 2 || @ Diamondbacks || 7–14 || Leake (11–10) || Quantrill (6–6) || — || 23,477 || 64–73 || L1
|-style=background:#fbb
||138|| September 3 || @ Diamondbacks || 1–2 || Kelly (10–13) || Bolaños (0–1) || Bradley (11) || 15,402 || 64–74 || L2
|-style=background:#fbb
||139|| September 4 || @ Diamondbacks || 1–4 || Gallen (3–4) || Stammen (7–7) || Bradley (12) || 18,096 || 64–75 || L3
|-style=background:#fbb
||140|| September 6 || Rockies || 2–3 || Melville (2–1) || Lamet (2–4) || Díaz (1) || 26,073 || 64–76 || L4
|-style=background:#bfb
||141|| September 7 || Rockies || 3–0 || Lucchesi (10–7) || Hoffman (1–6) || Yates (40) || 29,709 || 65–76 || W1
|-style=background:#bfb
||142|| September 8 || Rockies || 2–1  || Stammen (8–7) || Tinoco (0–2) || — || 26,834 || 66–76 || W2
|-style=background:#fbb
||143|| September 9 || Cubs || 2–10 || Hendricks (10–9) || Quantrill (6–7) || — || 22,420 || 66–77 || L1
|-style=background:#bfb
||144|| September 10 || Cubs || 9–8  || Báez (1–1) || Cishek (3–6) || — || 25,497 || 67–77 || W1
|-style=background:#bfb
||145|| September 11 || Cubs || 4–0 || Paddack (9–7) || Hamels (7–7) || — || 24,203 || 68–77 || W2
|-style=background:#fbb
||146|| September 12 || Cubs || 1–4 || Darvish (6–6) || Lamet (2–5) || — || 22,501 || 68–78 || L1
|-style=background:#fbb
||147|| September 13 || @ Rockies || 8–10 || Hoffman (2–6) || Lucchesi (10–8) || Díaz (4) || 31,654 || 68–79 || L2
|-style=background:#fbb
||148|| September 14 || @ Rockies || 10–11 || Lambert (3–6) || Lauer (8–9) || Tinoco (1) || 47,370 || 68–80 || L3
|-style=background:#fbb
||149|| September 15 || @ Rockies || 5–10 || Howard (1–0) || Quantrill (6–8) || — || 30,699 || 68–81 || L4
|-style=background:#fbb
||150|| September 16 || @ Brewers || 1–5 || Davies (10–7) || Richards (0–1) || — || 33,215 || 68–82 || L5
|-style=background:#fbb
||151|| September 17 || @ Brewers || 1–3 || Albers (8–5) || Strahm (5–9) || Pomeranz (2) || 34,565 || 68–83 || L6
|-style=background:#bfb
||152|| September 18 || @ Brewers || 2–1 || Lamet (3–5) || Houser (6–7) || Yates (41) || 38,235 || 69–83 || W1
|-style=background:#fbb
||153|| September 19 || @ Brewers || 1–5 || Peralta (7–3) || Lucchesi (10–9) || Hader (34) || 31,687 || 69–84 || L1
|-style=background:#fbb
||154|| September 20 || Diamondbacks || 0–9 || Kelly (12–14) || Lauer (8–10) || — || 27,023 || 69–85 || L2
|-style=background:#fbb
||155|| September 21 || Diamondbacks || 2–4 || Clarke (5–5) || Strahm (5–10) || Bradley (16) || 30,191 || 69–86 || L3
|-style=background:#bfb
||156|| September 22 || Diamondbacks || 6–4  || Strahm (6–10) || López (2–7) || — || 31,293 || 70–86 || W1
|-style=background:#fbb
||157|| September 24 || Dodgers || 3–6 || Gonsolin (4–2) || Bolaños (0–2) || Jansen (31) || 29,708 || 70–87 || L1
|-style=background:#fbb
||158|| September 25 || Dodgers || 4–6 || Floro (5–3) || Bednar (0–1) || Jansen (32) || 30,552 || 70–88 || L2
|-style=background:#fbb
||159|| September 26 || Dodgers || 0–1 || Kershaw (16–5) || Lucchesi (10–10) || Maeda (3) || 26,285 || 70–89 || L3
|-style=background:#fbb
||160|| September 27 || @ Diamondbacks || 3–6 || Scott (1–0) || Perdomo (2–4) || Bradley (18) || 32,244 || 70–90 || L4
|-style=background:#fbb
||161|| September 28 || @ Diamondbacks || 5–6 || Sherfy (1–0) || Bednar (0–2) || Ginkel (2) || 46,477 || 70–91 || L5
|-style=background:#fbb
||162|| September 29 || @ Diamondbacks || 0–1 ||Crichton (1–0) ||Strahm (6–11) || — ||45,446 || 70–92 ||L6
|-

|- style="text-align:center;"
| Legend:       = Win       = Loss       = PostponementBold = Padres team member

Roster

Farm system

References

External links
San Diego Padres official site
2019 San Diego Padres at Baseball-Reference.com

San Diego Padres seasons
San Diego Padres
San Diego Padres